The 1916 Chicago Maroons football team was an American football team that represented the University of Chicago during the 1916 college football season.  In their 25th season under head coach Amos Alonzo Stagg, the Maroons compiled a 3–4 record, finished in fourth place in the Western Conference, and were outscored by their opponents by a combined total of 110 to 65.

In the first game of the season, Carleton College traveled to Chicago and beat the Maroons 7-0 in a shocking upset.

Schedule

References

Chicago
Chicago Maroons football seasons
Chicago Maroons football